The 1981 NCAA Division II Women's Volleyball Championship was the first annual NCAA-sponsored tournament to determine the national champions of Division II women's collegiate volleyball in the United States.

Sacramento State defeated Lewis (IL) in straight sets, 3–0 (15–10, 15–6, 15–7), in the final to claim their first national title. The Hornets were coached by Debby Colberg.

Bracket

See also 
NCAA Division I Women's Volleyball Championship
NCAA Division III Women's Volleyball Championship
NAIA Volleyball Championship

References 

NCAA Women's Volleyball Championship
NCAA Division II Women's Volleyball Championship
NCAA Division II Women's Volleyball Championship
NCAA Division II Women's Volleyball Championship